Ross Owen is a Welsh international lawn and indoor bowler.

Bowls career
Owen won the Welsh National Bowls Championships fours in 2017 and the following year the triples, both National titles were won when bowling for Harlequins BC. He was the National Indoor Pairs Champion in 2014. In 2015 he won the fours bronze medal at the Atlantic Bowls Championships.

Owen bowls for Harlequins (outdoors) and Cynon Valley (indoors) and was selected for the Welsh team for the 2016 World Outdoor Bowls Championship in Avonhead, Christchurch, New Zealand and the 2018 Commonwealth Games on the Gold Coast in Queensland, Australia.

In 2019 he won the fours bronze medal at the Atlantic Bowls Championships and in 2020 he was selected for the 2020 World Outdoor Bowls Championship in Australia. In 2021, Owen reached the final of the pairs and fours at the 2021 Welsh National Bowls Championships.

In 2022, he competed in the men's triples, where he won a bronze medal and the men's fours at the 2022 Commonwealth Games.

References 

Welsh male bowls players
Living people
Bowls players at the 2018 Commonwealth Games
Bowls players at the 2022 Commonwealth Games
1994 births
Commonwealth Games competitors for Wales
Commonwealth Games bronze medallists for Wales
Commonwealth Games medallists in lawn bowls
Medallists at the 2022 Commonwealth Games